Ka-Boom was an Italian children's programming block. It was aimed at children between the ages of 8 and 14.

History
After period of experimental services started 3 July 2013, Ka-Boom was launched on 23 September 2013.

Availability
It was available free to air on digital terrestrial television multiplex Tivuitalia.

Programming

Animated series 
 Boys Be...
 Ceres, Celestial Legend
 Chi's Sweet Home
 Fresh World Cocomon
 Gin Tama (second season)
 Growing Up With Hello Kitty
 Heroes of the City
 Oh My Goddess!
 Sugarbunnies
 Sugarbunnies: Chocolat!
 X

See also
 Rai Gulp
 Rai YoYo
 Boing
 Cartoonito
 K2
 Frisbee

Children's television networks
Italian-language television stations
Television channels and stations established in 2013
Television channels and stations disestablished in 2015
Defunct television channels in Italy
2013 establishments in Italy
2015 disestablishments in Italy